Hairdressers Journal International is a monthly glossy magazine for the hairdressing industry, published in the United Kingdom. The magazine has been in circulation since 1882 and is considered a source of information for the industry. As well as hairdressing imagery, HJ also provides trend features, salon business advice and coverage of news and events in the hairdressing industry. The magazine's executive director is Jayne Lewis-Orr.

In 2015, Reed Business Information sold HJ to M Squared Media.

British Hairdressing Awards 
HJ hosts the annual British Hairdressing Awards, in association with Schwarzkopf Professional. The British Hairdressing Awards were launched in 1985.

British Hairdressing Business Awards 

HJ also hosts the annual British Hairdressing Business Awards, which celebrate the business side of the hairdressing industry in the UK.

There are 16 categories in the awards covering areas including retail, marketing, salon design, innovation, customer care and training, as well as the Business Director of the Year.

Salon International 

HJ hosts an annual three-day hair and beauty trade show called Salon International. Currently held at ExCel London, it was founded in 1973 and takes place each October.

British Hairdressing Awards Hall of Fame 

Any stylist who wins three times in the same category at the British Hairdressing Awards is inducted to the Hall of Fame. This also means they can no longer enter in that same category. Past winners, and the category they were inducted for, are;

2020 - Lisa Graham & Joseph I’Anson (Eastern), Julie Cherry (Northern Ireland), Andrea Giles & Terri Kay (Men’s)
2019 - Martin Crean (Wales and South West), Mark Leeson Art Team (Artistic Team)
2018 - Marcello Moccia (North Western), Michelle Thompson (Afro), Robert Eaton (Colour)
2017 - Charlotte Mensah (Afro)
2016 - Indira Shauwecker (Avant Garde)
2015 - Cos Sakkas (London)
2014 - Jamie Stevens (London), Philip Bell (Scottish), Bruno Marc Giamattei (Southern)
2013 - No new inductees
2012 - Ken Picton (Wales and Southwest), Kevin Kahan (Northern Ireland), Kay McIntyre (Scottish)
2011 - HOB Creative Team (Artistic Team), Terri Kay (Eastern), Christel Lundqvist (Schwarzkopf Professional British Colour Technician)
2010 - Sharon Peake (North Western)
2009 - Darren Ambrose (Avant Garde)
2008 - Tracey Devine (Scotland), Claire Rothstein (Afro)
2007 - Tim Scott-Wright (Midlands), Robert Eaton (North Eastern), Errol Douglas (Afro)
2006 - Mark Leeson (Eastern), Michael Young (North Western), Tina Farey (Southern), Jamie & Sally Brooks (London)
2005 - Charlie Taylor (Scottish), Robert Smith (Southern), Lisa Shepherd (Schwarzkopf Professional British Colour Technician)
2004 - Kathryn Longmuir (Afro), Charles & Karen Doods (North Western), Angelo Seminara (Avant Garde)
2003 - Lisa Shepherd (Midlands), Shane Bennett (Northern Ireland)
2002 - Jason and India Miller (Scottish), Desmond Murray (Afro)
2001 - Paul Stafford (Northern Ireland), Lawrence Anthony Cole (Midlands)
2000 - Tim Avory (Southern), Steven Goldsworthy (Wales and South West)
1999 - Phil Smith (Wales and South West)
1997 - Eugene Souleiman (Session), Keith Harris (Avant Garde), Mark Hill (North Western)
1996 - Umberto Giannini (Midlands)
1995 - Nicky Clarke (London), Gary Hooker (North Western)
1994 - Tom Mulrine (Northern Ireland), Sam McKnight (Session)
1993 - Terry Calvert (Eastern), TONI&GUY Artistic Team (Artistic Team)
1991 - Terry Jacques (Afro), Anthony Mascolo (British)
1990 - Guy Kremer (Southern), Jon Richardson (Eastern)
1989 - Trevor Sorbie (London), Charlie Miller (Northern)
1987 - Andrew Collinge (Midlands)

References 

Professional and trade magazines
Hairdressing
Magazines published in London
Magazines established in 1882
RELX
Monthly magazines published in the United Kingdom